Brno municipal election in 2018 was held as part of 2018 Czech municipal elections. ANO 2011 led by incumbent Mayor Petr Vokřál received highest number of votes being followed by Civic Democratic Party (ODS). ODS formed coalition with KDU-ČSL, ČSSD and Pirates after the election. Markéta Vaňková of ODS became the new Mayor.

Background
Previous election was held in 2014. It was a victory for ANO 2011. A protest party called Žít Brno was also successful. Žít Brno is inspired by Icelandic Best Party. ANO formed a coalition with Žít Brno, Green Party and Christian and Democratic Union – Czechoslovak People's Party. Petr Vokřál from ANO became Mayor of Brno.

Žít Brno decided to not participate in the 2018 election. Its members instead sought nomination from Czech Pirate Party. The Pirates nominated Tomáš Koláčný as its leader. Only one member of Žít Brno received nomination from Pirate Party.

The Civic Democratic Party announced on 24 April 2018 that it will participate election with support of Party of Free Citizens. Markéta Vaňková became candidate for Mayor. Party launched its campaign along with the announcement. Vaňková stated that she isn't satisfied with the current political development in Brno. She criticised ruling coalition for stagnation. She noted that many projects started by previous coalition aren't finished yet.

Current composition of assembly

Opinion polls

Result

References

2018
2018 elections in the Czech Republic